Namal Lake is located near Rikhi, a village on one corner of the Namal valley in Mianwali District, Punjab, Pakistan. There are mountains on its western and southern sides. On the other two sides are agricultural areas.

History
In 1913, British engineers, to meet the scarcity of irrigation and drinking water, built a dam on this Namal lake and  irrigated lands up to Mianwali city. But with the passage of time and construction of Thal Canal and installation of tube wells, its utility of water squeezed up to some limit.

The gates of the dam are repaired by the irrigation department regularly but without enthusiasm. The hill torrents and rains fill the Namal Lake round the year. Due to a drought-like situation in the country, this lake dried up last year, which is the first incident of its kind during the last 100 years.Presently, its condition is very bad.

Namal Canal 
The Nammal Canal was opened in December 1913. It received The Namal water from a lake of dam constructed across a gorge canal between Nammal and Musa-Khel. The tail of the canal was at Mianwali, where it conveys water to lands in the Civil Station. The canal was included under schedule-1 of the Minor Canals Act of 1905 by Punjab Government notification No. 84, dated the 9th June 1914.

See also
List of lakes in Pakistan
Namal College

References

External links
Namal Valley  
Namal Mianwali website

Lakes of Punjab (Pakistan)
Mianwali District